Dancing in the Rain may refer to:

Film and TV
Dancing in the Rain (film) (Ples v dežju), 1961 Slovene film directed by Boštjan Hladnik
"Dancing in the Rain", an episode of Step It Up and Dance
Dancing in the Rain (Ballroom dancing) BBC documentary 1986 Jenny Barraclough

Music

Albums
Dancing in the Rain, 1986 album by Frankie Miller
Dancing in the Rain, 2006 album by San Miguel Master Chorale
Dance in the Rain, 2014 album by Ricki-Lee Coulter

Songs
"Dancing in the Rain" (song), a song by Spanish singer Ruth Lorenzo chosen to represent Spain at the Eurovision Song Contest 2014.
"Dancing in the Rain", song by Robi Draco Rosa from Mad Love
"Dancing in the Rain", number from the musical Curley McDimple
"Dance in the Rain" (Kumi Koda song), song by Kumi Koda from Walk of My Life
"Dance in the Rain", song by Megadeth from Super Collider